Russow may refer to:
 Balthasar Russow, one of the most important Livonian and Estonian chroniclers.
 Edmund Russow, a Baltic German biologist.
 Joan Russow, a Canadian peace activist and former national leader of the Green Party of Canada.
 Lev Russov, a Soviet Russian painter, graphic artist, and sculptor
 Mike Russow, an American professional mixed martial artist.
 Russów, a village in Poland.